Serge Aubrey Savard  (born January 22, 1946) is a Canadian former professional ice hockey defenceman, most famously with the Montreal Canadiens of the National Hockey League (NHL).  He is the Senior Vice President, Hockey Operations with the Montreal Canadiens. He is also a local businessman in Montreal, and is nicknamed "the Senator." In 2017 Savard was named one of the 100 Greatest NHL Players in history.

Playing career
Savard played minor league hockey with the Montreal Junior Canadiens, then with the Omaha Knights.  After playing with the Montreal Jr. Canadiens, he started playing with the Montreal Canadiens in 1966.  In 1968–69, his second full NHL season, he led the Canadiens to a second consecutive Stanley Cup win, becoming the first defencemen to win the Conn Smythe Trophy as the playoffs' most valuable player.  In fifteen seasons with the Canadiens, Savard played on eight Stanley Cup championship teams: 1968, 1969, 1971, 1973, 1976, 1977, 1978, and 1979.  In 1979, he won the Bill Masterton Memorial Trophy for perseverance and dedication to the game.  Savard played the last two seasons of his career with the Winnipeg Jets before retiring in 1983. Savard was the second last player of the Original Six era, as Wayne Cashman and his Boston Bruins advanced to the next round of the playoffs, while Winnipeg did not.

The "Savardian Spin-o-rama", which is a quick pivoting turn with the puck done in order to evade opponents, was coined by sportscaster Danny Gallivan and named after Serge Savard, and not Denis Savard (who was adept at the same manoeuvre) as is often thought. However, Serge did say that it was Doug Harvey, a Montreal defenseman whom Savard idolized, who inspired him to mimic the move Harvey had started.

Savard played for Canada in the 1972 Summit Series against the Soviet Union. Team Canada was 4-0-1 when Savard was in the starting lineup. He did not play in the opening loss at the Forum in Montreal but was in the starting lineup for games 2 and 3 in Toronto and Winnipeg (a win and tie, respectively). He suffered a hairline fracture in his leg which forced him to sit out Canada's losses in games 4 and 5. He returned to the lineup for games 6, 7, and 8, all wins for Canada.

Post-playing career
After Savard retired as a player, he was named the general manager of the Canadiens, also serving as Manager of minor league team Sherbrooke Canadiens.  Savard won the Calder Cup with Sherbrooke in 1985. In 1986 and 1993 he was the general manager of the Stanley Cup Champion Montreal Canadiens.

In 1994 he was made an Officer of the Order of Canada.  In 2004, he was made a Knight of the National Order of Quebec. He is currently the chairman of the annual Canada Day festivities in Montreal. He lived a few years in Saint-Bruno-de-Montarville, Quebec. His son Marc ran for the Liberal Party in the riding of Saint-Bruno-Saint-Hubert in the 2005 federal election but lost.

In 1998, he was ranked number 81 on [[List of 100 greatest hockey players by The Hockey News|The Hockey News''' list of the 100 Greatest Hockey Players]].

Since 1993, Savard has been a partner in a firm of real-estate developers, Thibault, Messier, Savard & Associates, based in Montreal.

In September 2004, Savard was arrested in Montreal under suspicion of drunk driving.  He pleaded not guilty in November 2004, but would later plead guilty in May 2006.

On November 18, 2006, the Montreal Canadiens retired his jersey number (18) in a special ceremony at Bell Centre.

In April 2012 after the dismissal of Pierre Gauthier, Montreal Canadiens Owner Geoff Molson called upon Savard to assist and advise him in the team's search for a new General Manager.

Savard was part owner in a resort called El Senador'' located in Cayo Coco, Cuba until it was sold in 2005. The name was a reference to his nickname.

Awards
Won Conn Smythe Trophy — 1969
Named an NHL Second-Team All-Star — 1979
Played in 4 NHL All-Star Games (1970, 1973, 1977, 1978)
Played in the 1979 Challenge Cup
Won Bill Masterton Memorial Trophy — 1979
Inducted into the Hockey Hall of Fame — 1986
In 1998, he was ranked number 81 on ''The Hockey News''' list of the 100 Greatest Hockey Players.

Career statistics

Regular season and playoffs

* Stanley Cup Champion.

International

See also
 Captain
 List of NHL players with 1000 games played

References

"One on One with Serge Savard" by Kevin Shea, December 16, 2003, retrieved August 10, 2006

External links

 

1946 births
Living people
Bill Masterton Memorial Trophy winners
Canadian ice hockey defencemen
Conn Smythe Trophy winners
Hockey Hall of Fame inductees
Houston Apollos players
Ice hockey people from Montreal
Knights of the National Order of Quebec
Montreal Canadiens executives
Montreal Canadiens players
Montreal Junior Canadiens players
National Hockey League players with retired numbers
Officers of the Order of Canada
Omaha Knights (CHL) players
Order of Hockey in Canada recipients
Stanley Cup champions
Winnipeg Jets (1979–1996) players